Agyneta danielbelangeri is a species of sheet weaver found in Canada and the United States. It was described by Dupérré in 2013.

References

danielbelangeri
Spiders described in 2013
Spiders of Canada
Invertebrates of the United States